Strengths and weaknesses generally refer to a person's character.

Often a strength can be a weakness, and vice versa, a weakness can be a strength. In Chinese philosophy, yin and yang (e.g., dark and light) are described as complementary opposites within a greater whole.

References

See also
Aptitude
Intelligence
Physical strength
Virtues and Vices
Character Strengths and Virtues

Personality